Eslamabad (also Romanized as Eslāmābād) is a village in Bakan Rural District, Hasanabad District, Eqlid County, Fars Province, Iran. At the 2006 census, its population was 338, in 72 families.

References 

Populated places in Eqlid County